The Moma Range (Momsky Khrebet) is a range of mountains in far North-eastern Russia. Administratively the range is part of the Sakha Republic of the Russian Federation. The nearest town is Khonuu, served by Moma Airport.

Etymology
The name originated in the Evenki language, where "мома" means wood, timber or tree.

Geography
It is parallel to the latter and separated from it by a wide intermontane basin, where the Moma River flows from the southeast and joins the Indigirka. Turning northwards, the Indigirka River cuts deeply across the range in its northwestern part. The Aby Lowland, part of the Yana-Indigirka Lowland, lies to the north and the Alazeya Plateau to the east.

Rivers Badyarikha, a tributary of the Indigirka, and Ozhogina, a tributary of the Kolyma, flow from the northern slopes of the Moma Range.

In some works the Moma Range is included in the Chersky mountain system.

See also
List of ultras of Northeast Asia

References

Mountain ranges of the Sakha Republic